Metiskow is a hamlet in central Alberta, Canada, within the Municipal District of Provost No. 52.

Demographics 
Metiskow recorded a population of 65 in the 1991 Census of Population conducted by Statistics Canada.

See also 
List of communities in Alberta
List of hamlets in Alberta

References 

Hamlets in Alberta
Municipal District of Provost No. 52